David Gustafsson (born 11 April 2000) is a Swedish professional ice hockey center currently playing for the  Winnipeg Jets of the National Hockey League (NHL). He was drafted 60th overall by the Jets in the 2018 NHL Entry Draft.

Playing career
Gustafsson made his Swedish Hockey League debut as a 17-year old playing with HV71 during the 2017–18 SHL season. He registered 6 goals and 12 points in 45 games.

After his selection to the Jets in the 2018 NHL Entry Draft, Gustafsson played through his second full season in 2018–19 with HV71  posting 2 goals and 12 points in 36 games.

On 13 June 2019, Gustafsson was signed by the Winnipeg Jets to a three-year, entry-level contract. Gustafsson scored his first NHL goal on 27 November 2019, against the San Jose Sharks.

On 27 August 2020, following the Jets' elimination from the 2020 Stanley Cup playoffs, Gustafsson returned to Sweden, joining Tingsryds AIF of the HockeyAllsvenskan on loan until the commencement of the delayed 2020–21 North American season.

Career statistics

Regular season and playoffs

International

References

External links

2000 births
Living people
HV71 players
Manitoba Moose players
Swedish ice hockey centres
Tingsryds AIF players
Winnipeg Jets draft picks
Winnipeg Jets players